Liliana Topea (born 4 January 1967) is a Romanian-born Austrian retired handball player.  

She competed at the 1992 Summer Olympics, where Austria placed 5th.

Honours

Club
TV Lützellinden
EHF Champions League: 
1990–91

Hypo Niederösterreich
Austrian League Champion:
1991–92, 1992–93, 1993–94
Austrian Cup: 
1991–92, 1992–93, 1993–94
EHF Champions League: 
1991–92, 1992–93, 1993–94

External links
Profile at eurohandball.com

References

1967 births
Living people
Romanian expatriate sportspeople in Austria
Austrian female handball players
Austrian people of Romanian descent
Olympic handball players of Austria
Handball players at the 1992 Summer Olympics
Naturalised citizens of Austria